The International Association of Filipinologists is a defunct international organization of Filipino and foreign intellectuals established in Paris, 1889 by the Bohemian scientist Dr. Ferdinand Blumentritt and Philippine national hero Dr. José Rizal. Though a self-recognized convention, it was never accredited and recognized by the French government leading to its dissolution in August 1889.

Background

The idea of an association to invest Filipino self-identity came upon Dr. José Rizal before the end of 1888. This was due to the incoming International Exposition of 1889 in Paris, France that many people will observe the beauty of Philippine culture. According to his announcement letters written in London on December 31, 1888:

In his June 22, 1889 letter to Marcelo H. del Pilar written in Paris, Dr. Rizal also said that the grace of God and Fate is betrothed upon them and to their fellow Filipinos, too, and they should have the right to be free because "they have the just cause and justice for the country".

Rizal proposed the idea of having an established International Association of Filipinologists and have its inaugural convention on Paris. In a letter dated January 14, 1889, Rizal broached the idea to his friend, Dr. Ferdinand Blumentritt who gladly supported him.

The association 
On the preceding months, Rizal sent invitation to his friends, including some prominent European scientists regarding the plan. He prepared the prospectus of this international association. According to his prospectus, the aim of the association.

Notes 

1889 disestablishments
1889 establishments in France
Organizations based in Paris
José Rizal